Marble Valley is a band formed by Steve West, the drummer of the indie rock band Pavement.

Marble Valley is an international collective of individuals moulded together by Steve West, Pavement's drummer since Crooked Rain, Crooked Rain, and with David Berman on the Silver Jews albums, Starlite Walker and Tanglewood Numbers. Breakthrough is the band's 4th since 1997 and was conceived on 5 continents, in 17 different countries while touring the planet during Pavement's reunion tour in 2010. It was mostly recorded by Remko in his Amsterdam studio.

Personnel
Steve 'John' West – Vocals
Remko 'Duche' Schouten – Samples & Vocals
James Waudby – Guitars & Vocals
Andy Dimmack – Drums & Vocals
Carl Hogarth – Piano & Keyboards
Robert 'Beige' Ellerby – Bass
Aaron Gammon – Percussion & Samples

Discography 
Sauckiehall Street - Echo Static Records (1997)
Sunset Sprinkler - Echo Static Records (2000)
Wild Yams - Indikator Rekords (2006)
Slash & Laugh - Indikator Rekords - Distributed in the UK by Sea Records (2008)
Super Sober ep - Sea Records (2010)
Breakthrough - Sea Records (2011)

External links

American indie rock groups